The Electronic Journal of Combinatorics is a peer-reviewed open access scientific journal covering research in combinatorial mathematics.
The journal was established in 1994 by Herbert Wilf (University of Pennsylvania) and Neil Calkin (Georgia Institute of Technology). The Electronic Journal of Combinatorics is a founding member of the Free Journal Network. According to the Journal Citation Reports, the journal had a 2017 impact factor of 0.762.

Editors-in-chief

Current
The current editors-in-chief at Electronic Journal of Combinatorics are:

 Maria Axenovich, Karlsruhe Institute of Technology, Germany
 Miklós Bóna, University of Florida, United States
 Julia Böttcher, London School of Economics, United Kingdom
 Richard A. Brualdi, University of Wisconsin, Madison, United States
 Zdeněk Dvořák, Charles University, Czech Republic
 Eric Fusy, CNRS/LIX, École Polytechnique, France
 Catherine Greenhill, UNSW Sydney, Australia
 Felix Joos, Universität Heidelberg, Germany
 Brendan McKay, Australian National University, Australia
 Bojan Mohar, Simon Fraser University, Canada
 Marc Noy, Universitat Politècnica de Catalunya, Spain
 Greta Panova, University of Southern California, United States 
 Alexey Pokrovskiy, University College London, United Kingdom
 Gordon Royle, University of Western Australia, Australia
 Bruce Sagan, Michigan State University, United States
 Paco Santos, University of Cantabria, Spain
 Maya Stein, University of Chile, Chile
 Edwin van Dam, Tilburg University, Netherlands
 Ian Wanless, Monash University, Australia
 David Wood, Monash University, Australia 
 Qing Xiang, Southern University of Science and Technology, China

Since 2013, one of the editors-in-chief has been designated the Chief Editorial Officer. The present officer is Richard Brualdi.

Past 
The following people have been editors-in-chief of the Electronic Journal of Combinatorics:

Dynamic surveys 
In addition to publishing normal articles, the journal also contains a class of articles called Dynamic Surveys that are not assigned to volumes and can be repeatedly updated by the authors.

Open access 
Since its inception, the journal has been diamond-model open access, charging no fees to either authors or readers.

Copyright 
Since its inception, the journal has left copyright of all published material with its authors. Instead, authors provide the journal with an irrevocable licence to publish and agree that any further publication of the material acknowledges the journal. Since 2018, authors have been strongly encouraged to release their articles under a Creative Commons license.

References

External links 
 

Combinatorics journals
Publications established in 1994
Open access journals
English-language journals
Online-only journals